1965 Pan Arab Games 

 Egypt, Cairo
 September 2–14

MEN

100m

200m

400m

800m

1500m

5000m

10,000m

Marathon

3000SC

110H

400H

HJ

PV

LJ

TJ

SP

DT

HT

JT

20kmW

50kmW

Decathlon

4x100m

4x400m

References 
1965 Pan Arab Games
Athletics at the Pan Arab Games